"Bangarang" is a 2012 song by Skrillex.

Bangarang may also refer to:

 Bangarang, alternative spelling of Pangerang 
 "Bangarang" (Doomtree song), a 2012 song by Doomtree
 Bangarang (EP), a 2011 EP by Skrillex
 Bangarang (The Best of Stranger Cole 1962-1972), a 2003 album by Stranger Cole
 A slang term frequently used in the film Hook (film)

See also
 Bangerang, Victoria, a town in Australia